Bady Bassitt is a municipality in the state of São Paulo, Brazil. The population is 17,761 (2020 est.) in an area of 110 km². The town is located 7 km from São José do Rio Preto, and the municipality belongs to the Microregion of São José do Rio Preto.

History

In 1908, Bady Bassitt was a village named Borboleta (butterfly). In this year, a road coming from Rio Preto was open. Camilo de Morais opened the first store in Borboleta, in 1912.

On February 13, 1914, the village of Borboleta was officially established, and on December 12, 1926, the village was elevated to district of Rio Preto.

On February 18, 1959, the municipality of Borboleta is officially established, and in 1963, the name was changed to the current form, an homage to Bady Bassitt, a politician from São José do Rio Preto.

Geography

Neighbouring places

Mirassol, northwest
São José do Rio Preto, northeast
Nova Aliança, southwest
Potirendaba, south
Cedral, southeast

Hydrography

The municipality features several streams:
Córrego Borá
Córrego dos Macacos
Córrego Borboleta (Main stream)

Demographics

Population history

Statistics
Area: 108.5 km²
Population density: 134.54/km² (IBGE/2010) - 222.90/km² (SEADE/2011)
Urbanization: 93.5% (2010)
Sex ratio (Males to Females): 98.2 (2011)
Birth rate: 11.8/1,000 inhabitants (2009)
Infant mortality: 5.95/1,000 births (2009)
Homicide rate: 0.0/100 thousand ppl (2008)
HDI: 0.812 (UNDP/2000)

All statistics are from SEADE and IBGE.

Economy

The Tertiary sector is the economic basis of Bady. Commerce, services and administration corresponds to 60.5% of the city GDP. Industry is 35.2% of the GDP, and the Primary sector corresponds to 4.1%.

Transportation

The city is linked with the  BR-153 (Transbrasiliana), the SP-310 (in Rio Preto) and the SP-355 (Maurício Goulart) highways.

External links
  http://www.badybassitt.sp.gov.br
  Bady Bassitt on citybrazil.com.br

References

Populated places established in 1910
Municipalities in São Paulo (state)